James Edgar Jamieson (July 20, 1873 – June 17, 1958) was an Ontario farmer and political figure. He represented Simcoe West from 1923 to 1926 and Simcoe Southwest from 1929 to 1934 in the Legislative Assembly of Ontario as a Conservative member.

He was born in Mulmur Corners, Mulmur, Ontario. In 1902, he married Sarah M. Crisp, a local schoolteacher. He owned a farm at Singhampton, later moving south of Collingwood. Jamieson served as reeve for Nottawasaga Township. He served thirty years on the executive of the Ontario Good Roads Association and was president in 1935. He was part of a group which convinced the provincial government to raise the hull of HMS Nancy and erect a building over it on Nancy Island near Wasaga Beach.

External links 

Mulmur : the story of a township (1951)

1873 births
1958 deaths
Progressive Conservative Party of Ontario MPPs